Project Runway Season 19 began Thursday, October 14, 2021. Sixteen designers compete to become "the next great American designer." Returning as judges are editor-in-chief of Elle, Nina Garcia; fashion designer Brandon Maxwell; and former editor-in-chief of Teen Vogue, Elaine Welteroth. Season 4 winner Christian Siriano returns to mentor the designers and use the "Siriano save" to bring an eliminated designer back into the competition if he disagrees with the judges' verdict. Karlie Kloss did not return as a host, but appeared in the penultimate episode of the season.

Designers

*Shantall Lacayo was a finalist on Project Runway Latin America season 1.

Designer Progress

 Due to mental health reasons, Meg withdrew from the competition, sparing Darren, Katie, and Kenneth from possible elimination.

 Although Katie was deemed safe, the judges let her know they loved her look.

: Despite two designers being marked safe, every designer was given a critique.

 The designer won Project Runway Season 19.
 The designer advanced to the Finale.
 The designer won the challenge.
 The designer was in the top two. 
 The designer had one of the highest scores but did not win.
 The designer had one of the lowest scores but was not eliminated.
 The designer was in the bottom two. 
 The designer was eliminated from the competition.
 The designer lost, but was saved from elimination by Christian Siriano using the "Siriano Save".
 The designer withdrew from the competition.

Model Progress

 Female, male, and non-binary models were used for this challenge.

 Different male and female models were used for this challenge.

 Women from the Real Housewives of Potomac, Orange County and New York City are the clients for this challenge.

 Coco Rocha was the only model for this challenge. There was no runway but instead a photo shoot.

 Aaron Michael - AM
 Anna Yinan Zhou - AZ
 Bones Jones - BJ
 Caycee Black - CB
 Chasity Sereal - CS
 Coral Castillo - CC
 Darren Apolonio - DA
 Katie Kortman - KK
 Kenneth Barlis - KB
 Kristina Kharlashkina - KT
 Meg Ferguson - MF
 Octavio Aguilar - OA
 Prajjé Oscar Jean-Baptiste - PJ
 Sabrina Spanta - SS
 Shantall Lacayo - SL
 Zayden Skipper - ZS

Episodes

Episode 1: A Colorful Return 
Original airdate: 

The season premiere begins at the iconic Lincoln Center where Christian Siriano, Nina Garcia, Elaine Welteroth, and Brandon Maxwell welcome a talented group of new designers eager to show the world their skills and creativity. In a Project Runway first, the designers will be split into two teams living and working separately to create mini-collections celebrating color. The competition comes to a head on the day of the runway show when they reunite hoping their team is victorious while someone from the losing team will be going home.

 Guest Judge: Jason Wu
 WINNER: Bones Jones
 ELIMINATED: Caycee Black

Episode 2: #STREETWEAR 
Original airdate: 

In their first individual challenge, the designers take on streetwear – the most relevant and individualized style in fashion. Working with male, female, and nonbinary models, the competitors dig into their unique personal experiences and cultures to create breakout looks.

 Guest Judge: Wisdom Kaye
 WINNER: Prajjé Oscar Jean-Baptiste
 WITHDREW: Meg Ferguson
 After a verbal altercation with Kenneth and Prajjé about switching models with Kenneth, Meg withdrew from the competition due to the stress of the competition on her mental health. Because Meg had already gone home this episode, the judges decided not to eliminate anyone.

Episode 3: If You Got It, Haunt It 
Original airdate: 

It’s Halloween and Christian has a few tricks up his stylish sleeve. The designers are sent to sleep in a haunted mansion to find inspiration for their challenge. If they can survive the night, they’ll have two days to create a hauntingly chic masquerade gown.

 Guest Judge: Taraji P. Henson
 WINNER: Chasity Sereal
 ELIMINATED: Kenneth Barlis

Episode 4: Flower Power 
Original airdate: 

For their fourth challenge, the designers show up to discover their work room has been “flower flashed”! Inspired by the colorful blooms, the designers must create their own unique floral print from scratch and turn it into a high-end runway look.

 Guest Judge: Gigi Hadid
 WINNER: Shantall Lacayo
 ELIMINATED: Darren Appolonio

Episode 5: Go For the Gold...Sequin 
Original airdate: 

Figure skating icons Tara Lipinski and Johnny Weir steal the spotlight for this celebrity client challenge. This charismatic duo known for their savage takes and outlandish fashion have come to Project Runway for one reason – they need looks for the upcoming 2022 Winter Olympics. The designers will compete in pairs and the winning looks will be worn by Tara and Johnny in front of a global audience live in primetime from the Olympics.

 Guest Judges: Tara Lipinski and Johnny Weir
 WINNER: Anna Yinan Zhou
 ELIMINATED: Sabrina Spanta

Episode 6: Fashion is Back, Baby! 
Original airdate: 

For the first time ever, our designers will collaborate with some of New York City’s most talented accessory designers who – like our designers – are all working to revitalize the fashion industry. Purses! Shoes! Gloves! Jewelry! Oh my! Taking inspiration from one another’s work, each collaborating duo is challenged to create a coordinated one-of-a-kind look and new accessory.

 Guest Judge: Steven Kolb
 WINNER: Kristina Kharlashkina
 ELIMINATED: Katie Kortman

Episode 7: Are You Fur Real? 
Original airdate: 

It's the avant garde challenge! Working in pairs, the designers must create innovative avant garde looks highlighting one of the most trendy and complicated of materials, faux fur.

 Guest Judge: Billy Porter & Esteban Cortazar (Sitting in for Brandon Maxwell)
 WINNER: Chasity Sereal
 SIRIANO SAVE: Shantall Lacayo

Episode 8: Couch Couture 
Original airdate: 

The designers are challenged to solve one of fashion's eternal struggles, if comfortable can really be chic; there's nothing comfortable about designing for a one day challenge with a surprise visit from Geoffrey Mac and Cyndi Lauper.

 Guest Judge: Maria Cornejo
 WINNER: Kristina Kharlashkina
 ELIMINATED: Octavio Aguilar & Zayden Skipper

Episode 9: The Last Straw 
Original airdate: 

The designers fall for an age-old prank when they’re invited out for cocktails by Christian Siriano only to discover that it’s actually challenge-time, not party-time. It’s time for the unconventional challenge where the designers will be asked to create an elegant cocktail dress from an actual cocktail bar.

 Guest Judge: Christopher John Rogers
 WINNER: Shantall Lacayo
 ELIMINATED: Prajjé Oscar Jean-Baptiste

Episode 10: The Housewives 
Original airdate: 

Bravo's Real Housewives of Potomac, Orange County and New York City bring their signature attitudes to the catwalk for a client challenge like no other; emotions run high as each designer is paired with a Housewife to make them a reunion show look.

 Guest Judge: Andy Cohen
 WINNER: Shantall Lacayo
 ELIMINATED: Anna Yinan Zhou

Episode 11: Haute Hair 
Original airdate: 

It’s time for a twist… a hair twist, that is! In this one day challenge, the designers are each teamed with an up-and-coming hairstylist for a head-to-toe fashion collaboration. The pairs will work together to create an innovative design and hair look that complement each other that showcases their creativity to the judges.

 Guest Judge: Precious Lee
 WINNER: Chasity Sereal
 ELIMINATED: Aaron Michael

Episode 12: The Model as Muse 
Original airdate: 

For the first time ever in Project Runway history, the designers will be creating looks for the same Supermodel in this one-of-a-kind challenge. They must create editorial looks specifically inspired by internationally renowned model, Coco Rocha. And shockingly, there’s no runway! The final five are tasked to show artistic range by delivering a perfect look and a perfect photograph to show it off.

 Guest Judge: Coco Rocha
 WINNER: Shantall Lacayo
 ELIMINATED: Bones Jones

Episode 13: The Sky is the Limit 
Original airdate: 

Four designers compete for only three spots in the Season 19 finale. For the last challenge, the designers will need to show the judges their brand and vision for the future of fashion in a single look. It’s no small task as these finalists put everything they’ve got into this runway show to convince Brandon, Elaine, Nina and guest judge Karlie Kloss that they deserve the opportunity to make a collection for New York Fashion Week.

 Guest Judge: Karlie Kloss
 ADVANCED: Chasity Sereal, Coral Castillo, Kristina Kharlashkina, Shantall Lacayo

Episode 14: Finale 
Original airdate: 

A winner for Season 19 is chosen at the iconic New York Fashion Week!

 Guest Judge: Tommy Hilfiger 
 WINNER OF PROJECT RUNWAY: Shantall Lacayo
 RUNNER-UPS: Kristina Kharlashkina, Chasity Sereal, Coral Castillo

Notes

References

External links 

Season 19
2021 American television seasons
2022 American television seasons